Kenny Goins (born September 11, 1996) is an American professional basketball player for Pieno žvaigždės Pasvalys of the Lithuanian Basketball League. He played college basketball for the Michigan State Spartans.

High school career
Goins played basketball for Warren Mott High School in Warren, Michigan. As a senior, he averaged 21.1 points, 14.8 rebounds and 4.8 blocks per game. Goins led his team to the Class A state quarterfinals and earned First Team All-State honors from the Associated Press. He played football for Mott as a tight end and had originally intended to play football in college, rather than basketball.

College career
Goins turned down multiple NCAA Division I basketball scholarship offers to play for Michigan State as a walk-on, despite the financial burden, in his freshman season. His family took out a loan of $17,000. Goins redshirted his first year with the team and earned a scholarship in his following season. He was sidelined for six weeks as a freshman after undergoing surgery to repair a sports hernia. Goins posted 3.4 points and 4.5 rebounds per game as a sophomore and made 14 starts. As a junior, Goins averaged 2.1 points and 2.8 rebounds per game, shooting 45.8 percent from the field. A reserve for his first three years, Goins became a regular member of the starting lineup in his senior season. In his senior season debut, Goins scored a then-career-high 17 points and led the Spartans with 11 rebounds against top-ranked Kansas. On November 27, 2018, he grabbed a career-high 17 rebounds in an 82–78 overtime loss to Louisville. On March 5, 2019, Goins scored a career-high 24 points in a 91–76 win over Nebraska. On March 31, he made a go-ahead three-pointer with 34.5 seconds left in an Elite Eight victory over first-seeded Duke at the NCAA tournament. As a senior, Goins averaged 7.9 points and a team-high 8.9 rebounds per game. He was an All-Big Ten Honorable Mention selection.

Professional career
After going undrafted in the 2019 NBA draft, Goins joined the Denver Nuggets for 2019 NBA Summer League. 

On July 18, 2019, he signed his first professional contract with Pallacanestro Trapani of the Serie A2 Basket. In 24 games, Goins averaged 11.5 points and 6.5 rebounds per game. 

On August 22, 2020, he signed with Kolossos Rodou of the Greek Basket League. On March 22, 2021, Goins parted ways with the Greek club, after averaging 9.7 points and 5.4 rebounds in 16 games.

On July 1, 2021, Goins officially signed with his second Greek club, Lavrio of the Basketball Champions League. He averaged 4.6 points and 3.9 rebounds per game. On December 4, Goins signed with Atomerőmű SE of the Hungarian Nemzeti Bajnokság I/A.

References

External links
Michigan State Spartans bio

1996 births
Living people
American men's basketball players
Power forwards (basketball)
American expatriate basketball people in Greece
American expatriate basketball people in Italy
Lavrio B.C. players
Pallacanestro Trapani players
Kolossos Rodou B.C. players
Michigan State Spartans men's basketball players
People from Troy, Michigan
Basketball players from Michigan